The Roman Catholic Archdiocese of Bujumbura is the Metropolitan See for the Ecclesiastical province of Bujumbura in Burundi.

History
 June 11, 1959: Established as Apostolic Vicariate of Usumbura from the Apostolic Vicariate of Kitega and Apostolic Vicariate of Ngozi
 November 10, 1959: Promoted as Diocese of Usumbura
 October 9, 1964: Renamed as Diocese of Bujumbura
 November 25, 2006: Promoted as Metropolitan Archdiocese of Bujumbura

Special churches
The cathedral is the Cathédrale Regina Mundi in Bujumbura.

Leadership, in reverse chronological order
 Metropolitan Archbishops of Bujumbura (Roman rite), below
 Archbishop Gervais Banshimiyubusa (since March 24, 2018)
 Archbishop Evariste Ngoyagoye (November 25, 2006  – March 24, 2018); see below
 Bishops of Bujumbura (Roman rite), below
 Bishop Evariste Ngoyagoye (April 21, 1997  – November 25, 2006); see above
 Bishop Simon Ntamwana (November 14, 1988  – January 24, 1997), appointed Archbishop of Gitega
 Bishop Michel Ntuyahaga (October 9, 1964  – November 14, 1988); see below
 Bishop of Usumbura (Roman rite), below
 Bishop Michel Ntuyahaga (November 10, 1959  – October 9, 1964); see above & below
 Vicar Apostolic of Usumbura (Roman rite), below
 Bishop Michel Ntuyahaga (June 11, 1959  – November 10, 1959); see above

Sufferagan Dioceses
Bubanza
Bururi

See also
Roman Catholicism in Burundi
List of Roman Catholic dioceses in Burundi

Sources
 GCatholic.org
 Catholic Hierarchy

Roman Catholic dioceses in Burundi
A
Christian organizations established in 1959
Bujumbura
Roman Catholic dioceses and prelatures established in the 20th century